Stigmella androflavus is a moth of the family Nepticulidae. It was described by Scoble in 1978. It is found in South Africa (it was described from Pretoria).

References

Endemic moths of South Africa
Nepticulidae
Moths of Africa
Moths described in 1978